Davide Cadoni (born 4 May 1973) is an Italian male retired middle-distance runner, which participated at the 1995 World Championships in Athletics.

Achievements

References

External links
 

1943 births
Italian male middle-distance runners
World Athletics Championships athletes for Italy
Living people
Athletics competitors of Fiamme Oro